Eucharist can refer to:
Eucharist, Communion, or the Lord's Supper
Eucharist (history), traditional and historical development
Eucharist in the Catholic Church
Eucharist (band), a death metal band from Sweden